Cyclocoela is a now-invalid classification of Ctenophora.

References

Ctenophores
Obsolete animal taxa